Lectionary 309 (Gregory-Aland), designated by siglum ℓ 309 (in the Gregory-Aland numbering) is a Greek manuscript of the New Testament, on parchment. Palaeographically it has been assigned to the 10th century. The manuscript is lacunose.

Description 

The original codex contained lessons from the Gospels (Evangelistarium), on 8 parchment leaves, with some lacunae. The leaves are measured.
It has musical notes. Many leaves at the end and some leaves inside were lost

The text is written in Greek minuscule letters, in two columns per page, 22 lines per page.

The codex contains lessons, which were red from eleventh Sunday (Luke 14:20) to Sunday of the Publican (Luke 18:14).

History 

Gregory and Scrivener dated the manuscript to the 10th century. It is presently assigned by the INTF to the 10th century.

It belonged to the Tischendorf's collection. It was bought from Tischendorf's family for the university in 1876.

The manuscript was added to the list of New Testament manuscripts by Scrivener (295e) and Caspar René Gregory (number 309e). It was examined by Hort. Gregory saw it in 1883.

Currently the codex is housed at the Cambridge University Library (Add. Mss. 1879.2) in the Cambridge.

See also 

 List of New Testament lectionaries
 Biblical manuscript
 Textual criticism
 Lectionary 308

Notes and references

Bibliography 

 

Greek New Testament lectionaries
10th-century biblical manuscripts